George Edward Bastl (born 1 April 1975) is a former professional tennis player from Switzerland.

Tennis career

Bastl was an All-American at the University of Southern California.

He achieved a career-high singles ranking of World No. 71 in May 2000 and reached one ATP Tour singles final at Tashkent in 1999.

The biggest win of Bastl's tennis career came in the second round of the 2002 Wimbledon Championships, where he caused one of the biggest upsets in Wimbledon and Grand Slam history by defeating seven-time champion Pete Sampras, winning in five sets by the score of 6–3, 6–2, 4–6, 3–6, 6–4. Bastl had only been in the main draw of 2002 Wimbledon as a lucky loser, having previously lost to Alexander Waske in three straight sets in the final qualifying round at Roehampton. He beat Denis Golovanov in the first round and after beating Sampras he lost in the third round to eventual runner-up David Nalbandian. Bastl teamed up with Roger Federer in the men's doubles at the US Open in 2002. They got to the third round before being knocked out by Wayne Black and Kevin Ullyett.

Bastl was the first player to be beaten by Andy Murray in the main draw of a Grand Slam tournament, at Wimbledon in 2005, with Murray winning 6–4, 6–2, 6–2.

Singles titles (4)

Runners-up (6)

Performance timeline

Singles

References

External links
 Official website 
 
 
 

1975 births
Living people
Swiss male tennis players